Angelina Romanovna Melnikova (born 18 July 2000) is a Russian artistic gymnast. With eleven Olympic and World medals, she is the joint third-most decorated Russian gymnast of all time. At the 2020 Tokyo Olympics she led the Russian Olympic Committee to gold in the team competition. She previously represented Russia at the 2016 Summer Olympics, winning a silver medal in the team competition. She was also a member of the gold medal-winning Russian teams at the 2016 and 2018 European Championships, and the silver medal-winning Russian teams at the 2018 and 2019 World Championships.
 
Individually Melnikova is a two-time Olympic medalist, five-time World medalist, a nine-time European Championships medalist, a four-time European Games medalist, and a two-time Russian national all-around champion (2016, 2018). She is the 2020 Olympic all-around and floor bronze medalist, the 2021 World all-around champion, floor silver medalist, and vault bronze medalist, and the 2019 World all-around and floor bronze medalist. She is also the 2019 European Games all-around and uneven bars champion, the 2017 European champion on floor, and the 2021 European champion on uneven bars.  In winning the 2021 World all-around title, she became the first non-American to win a World or Olympic all-around title in over a decade.

At the junior level, Melnikova won gold medals at the 2014 European Championships in the team, all-around, and balance beam events and was the 2014 Russian junior all-around national champion. She has been captain of the Russian women's national gymnastics team since 2017.

Personal life
Angelina Romanovna Melnikova was born 18 July 2000 in Voronezh, Russia. She started gymnastics at age six after her grandmother brought her to a practice once.  She studied sport and tourism at the Smolensk State Academy of Physical Education.

Melnikova has received two major honors. Following the 2016 Olympic Games in Rio de Janeiro, she received the Order "For Merit to the Fatherland", as well as the title of Honoured Master of Sport in the Russian Federation. At the 2018 World Championships in Doha, Qatar, she was presented with the Longines Prize for Elegance.

In 2018, Melnikova started her own business designing and selling leotards.

Junior career

2014
Melnikova was added to Russia's junior national team in 2014 and made her international debut at the International Gymnix competition in Montreal.  She won the team gold medal alongside Anastasia Ilyankova, Daria Skrypnik, and Ekaterina Sokova and individually she won the all-around silver medal in the Junior International Cup behind Canadian Rose-Kaying Woo.  She also placed second on uneven bars and third on floor exercise.  In April Melnikova competed at the Russian National Championships with her home team, the Central Federal District.  Her team placed first with a combined total score of 267.966. Individually Melnikova had a strong showing and placed first in the Junior Master of the Sport division with a score of 58.300. She also won two other gold medals on balance beam and floor exercise with scores of 14.700 and 14.167 respectively. She competed in the uneven bars final and placed seventh. The results of these championships were used to help determine the gymnasts who would compete at the European Championships the following month in Sofia.  Due to her strong performance Melnikova was selected for the team.

At the European Championships Melnikova competed in the junior division alongside teammates Maria Bondareva, Daria Skrypnik, Seda Tutkhalyan, and Anastasia Dmitrieva.  As a team they placed first with a combined score of 168.268.  Melnikova then went on to win a gold medal in the all-around and on balance beam and a silver medal on the uneven bars behind teammate Skrypnik.

2015
Melnikova competed at the Junior Russian National Championships in Penza in early April. She finished in first place with her team, then went on to take the silver in the all-around, fifth on uneven bars, first on balance beam, and second on floor exercise.

In September she performed at the Russian Cup; she was ineligible to compete due to her junior status but she was able to perform as a guest.  Her overall score of 57.234 was the highest of the competition, beating official champion Daria Spiridonova's score of 56.733.

Melnikova competed at the Elite Gym Massilia meet in Marseille, France in November. She, alongside teammates Daria Skrypnik, Evgeniya Shelgunova, and Natalia Kapitonova, won the silver medal in the team competition.  Individually she won the all-around title ahead of France's Marine Brevet and Romania's Diana Bulimar.  She qualified to the floor exercise and uneven bars event finals, but counted falls in both events leaving her in sixth and fifth place respectively.

Senior career

2016
Melnikova became age-eligible for senior competition in 2016 and made her senior international debut at the DTB Pokal Team Challenge Cup where the Russian team won the gold medal.  Individually Melnikova scored the second highest all-around score behind 2012 Olympian and reigning European champion Giulia Steingruber of Switzerland.  In April Melnikova won her first senior national all-around title; additionally she placed first on balance beam and floor exercise and finished fifth on uneven bars.

In early June Melnikova competed at the European Championships.  During the team final she contributed on all four events towards Russia's first place finish.  Individually she qualified to the balance beam and uneven bars event finals.  She finished fifth on balance beam and withdrew from the uneven bars final so compatriot Daria Spiridonova could compete.

In July Melnikova was selected to represent Russia at the 2016 Summer Olympics in Rio de Janeiro, Brazil alongside Aliya Mustafina, Maria Paseka, Daria Spiridonova, and Seda Tutkhalyan.  Due her successful junior career and early season performances, Melnikova was expected to advance to numerous Olympic event finals and be in contention for an all-around medal.  However, Melnikova performed subpar during the qualification round, partially due to a strained hamstring suffered during podium training.  She fell off of the balance beam and again on floor exercise, failing to qualify into the individual all-around final or any of the event finals.  She improved upon her performance in the team final; she competed on all four apparatuses but still counted a fall on the balance beam.  Her performances helped contribute to Russia's team silver medal.

In November Melnikova competed at the Arthur Gander Memorial in Chiasso, Switzerland.  She won the three-event all-around ahead of Eythora Thorsdottir and Jessica López.  Melnikova next competed at the Swiss Cup, a mixed pairs event where she was partnered with Nikita Ignatyev.  They finished third behind the Ukrainian pair of Angelina Kysla and Oleg Verniaiev and the German pair of Kim Bui and Marcel Nguyen.

Melnikova ended the year competing at the Toyota International held in Toyota, Japan.  She finished fourth on vault, first on uneven bars, and second on balance beam and floor exercise behind Mai Murakami on both apparatuses.

2017
Melnikova was named as team captain of the Russian women's national team starting in 2017, succeeding Olympic teammate Aliya Mustafina.  Melnikova started her season at the Russian National Championships in Kazan. Although she was expected to do well in the absence of Olympic champion Aliya Mustafina, as well as coming into the meet as the reigning national champion, she faltered throughout the competition on every event except vault.  As a result she finished ninth in the all-around. Despite her poor showing at nationals Melnikova participated in the Stuttgart World Cup in March, placing second behind Germany's Tabea Alt and ahead of USA's Morgan Hurd.  The following month she competed at the City of Jesolo Trophy where she received three bronze medals in the team event, vault, and floor exercise.  Later Melnikova participated at the London World Cup. She competed poorly, falling on balance beam and floor exercise and having major mistakes on uneven bars and vault. Later that month it was announced that she would attend the European Championships as part of the Russian team, along with Elena Eremina, Natalia Kapitonova, and Olympic teammate Maria Paseka. During the qualification round Melnikova fell off the balance beam and uneven bars and she did not qualify for the individual all-around final. However she qualified for the vault and floor exercise finals. During the vault final her form was not as good as the other gymnasts, resulting in her coming 8th. During the floor exercise final she performed a clean routine which resulted in her winning the gold medal ahead of British gymnast Ellie Downie and Eythora Thorsdottir from the Netherlands.

In August Melnikova competed at the Russian Cup in Ekaterinburg, where she won the all-around ahead of Eremina and Maria Kharenkova. She also placed first on the balance beam and third on vault and in the team competition.

After the Russian Cup, Melnikova was selected to represent Russia at the World Championships along with Paseka, Eremina, and Anastasia Ilyankova. In qualifications Angelina competed the all-around, hitting her beam routine (12.600) but counting two falls and an out of bounds penalty on floor exercise due to a foot injury. Despite a low score of 11.166 on floor exercise she performed a clean Lopez and DTY (14.400) and hit her bars routine to qualify for the all-around final with a score of 53.132.  Her uneven bars score, 14.966, was the fourth highest in the competition, but she was not allowed to advance to the final due to the two-per-country rule; both Eremina and Ilyankova scored higher, with a 15.100 and 15.066 respectively.  Melnikova finished 16th in the all-around final.

In December Melnikova competed at the Voronin Cup where she finished first in the all-around, ahead of Viktoria Komova.

2018
At the start of the season Melnikova was selected to compete at the Stuttgart, Birmingham, and Tokyo World Cups; however, she was pulled out of the Tokyo World Cup in favor of teammate and first year senior Angelina Simakova. Melnikova started off her season at the Stuttgart World Cup, where she finished fifth after botching her pirouetting elements on uneven bars, falling off the balance beam, and under rotating her piked full in on floor exercise. However, a week later at the Birmingham World Cup, she was able to improve on her performances, managing to get her pirouettes on bars without losing swing, avoiding a fall on beam, and managing better landings on floor. Her performance was good enough to win the meet, finishing ahead of USA's Margzetta Frazier.

In April Melnikova competed at the 2018 City of Jesolo Trophy where she claimed a gold medal with the Russian team, ahead of Italy and Brazil. On vault she won a silver medal; on uneven bars she claimed the bronze behind teammate Anastasia Ilyankova and USA's Ragan Smith. On balance beam she won another bronze medal, this time behind the American first-year senior Emma Malabuyo and Smith. She also finished fourth in the all-around, behind Malabuyo, Smith, and Ilyankova, and fifth on floor exercise.

A week later Melnikova competed at the Russian National Championships. On the first day of competition she earned a silver medal with the Central Federal District team and qualified to the all-around and all four event finals. Several days later, after scoring 14.466 on vault, 14.433 on bars, 13.300 on beam, and 13.566 on floor exercise, Melnikova won the gold medal in the all around ahead of Angelina Simakova and Viktoria Komova. In the event finals she earned a silver on vault with a 14.049 average, behind Viktoria Trykina and ahead of Tatiana Nabieva; gold on uneven bars with a 14.266, ahead of guest competitor Irina Alexeeva and Komova; gold on balance beam with a 13.466, ahead of Ksenia Kamkova and Polina Fedorova; and gold on floor exercise with a 14.500, ahead of Simakova and Alexeeva.

In late June Melnikova competed at the Russian Cup. She was originally only going to compete uneven bars and balance beam due to nagging injuries, but later decided to compete all-around, where she finished first despite a fall on balance beam in qualification and a watered down floor routine. She also finished first with the Central Federal District team in the team competition and in the uneven bars final. Melnikova did not compete in the remaining event finals due to her knee injuries.

In August Melnikova competed at the European Championships in Glasgow. Together with her teammates Simakova, Alexeeva, Lilia Akhaimova, and Yuliana Perebinosova, she earned a gold medal in the team event. While Russia qualified into the team final behind France after a shaky qualifications performance, the team hit 12 out of 12 routines in the final to decisively win the title. In event finals she placed second on vault behind Boglárka Dévai of Hungary, third on uneven bars behind defending champion Nina Derwael of Belgium and Jonna Adlerteg of Sweden, and sixth on floor exercise.

On 29 September Melnikova was named to the nominative roster to compete at the 2018 World Championships in Doha, Qatar alongside Akhaimova, Alexeeva, Mustafina, and Simakova. On 17 October the Worlds team was officially announced and was unchanged from the nominative team. During qualifications Melnikova qualified to the all-around final in fifth place and to the floor exercise final in third place. Russia also qualified to the team final in second place. During the team final Melnikova competed on vault, uneven bars, and floor exercise, helping Russia win the silver medal. In the all-around final Melnikova finished in fifth place, just a tenth of a point behind silver medalist Mai Murakami of Japan, 0.034 points behind bronze medalist Morgan Hurd of the United States, and 0.001 points behind fourth-place finisher Nina Derwael of Belgium. She was later awarded the Longines Prize for Elegance alongside compatriot Artur Dalaloyan. She finished fourth in the floor exercise final, 0.033 points behind bronze medalist Murakami.

In mid-November Melnikova competed at the Arthur Gander Memorial in Chiasso, Switzerland. She placed fourth in the 3-event all-around behind Jade Barbosa and Flávia Saraiva of Brazil and Eythora Thorsdottir of the Netherlands. She then competed alongside countryman Nikita Nagornyy in the Swiss Cup, a unique mixed pairs event. After advancing to the final in first place, they won the silver medal behind German pair Elisabeth Seitz and Marcel Nguyen.

2019
In March Melnikova competed at the Russian National Championships where she placed second in the all-around behind Angelina Simakova. She won gold on the floor exercise, silver on vault and balance beam, and bronze on uneven bars. As a result, she was chosen to compete at the 2019 European Championships alongside Simakova, Maria Paseka, and Anastasia Ilyankova. Later that month Melnikova competed at the EnBW DTB-Pokal Team Challenge in Stuttgart. She won silver in the team final behind Brazil and in the individual all-around behind Brazilian Rebeca Andrade.

At the European Championships Melnikova qualified to the all-around final in first place, uneven bars and floor exercise finals in second place, and vault final in sixth place. She won bronze in the all-around final behind Mélanie de Jesus dos Santos of France and Ellie Downie of Great Britain. She placed fifth in the vault final and won the silver medal on uneven bars behind compatriot Anastasia Ilyankova. The next day, she competed the most difficult routine in the floor exercise final and won the bronze medal behind the defending floor exercise champion Mélanie de Jesus dos Santos and Eythora Thorsdottir of the Netherlands. This third medal tied her with de Jesus dos Santos as the most decorated female gymnast of the championships.

In May it was announced that Melnikova would compete at the European Games alongside Aliya Mustafina (later replaced by Anastasia Ilyankova) and Aleksandra Shchekoldina. During qualifications she finished first in the all-around and third on vault and balance beam, qualifying to those three event finals. Additionally she finished eighth on floor exercise and was the first reserve and finished sixth on uneven bars but did not qualify to the final due to teammate Ilyankova scoring higher. During the all-around final Melnikova won gold, finishing ahead of Lorette Charpy of France. The following day Ilyankova had to withdraw from the uneven bars final due to an allergic reaction and Melnikova replaced her. During event finals Melnikova won silver on vault behind Slovenian Teja Belak, gold on uneven bars, and silver on balance beam behind Nina Derwael of Belgium.

On July 9 it was announced that Melnikova would be featured in a year-long documentary series on the Olympic Channel titled All Around, alongside American Morgan Hurd and Chen Yile of China, which will follow their journeys and training leading up to the 2020 Summer Olympics in Tokyo.

In August Melnikova competed at the Russian Cup. After two days of competition she placed second in the all-around behind junior national team member Vladislava Urazova. On the first day of event finals Melnikova won silver on vault, finishing behind Lilia Akhaimova and bronze on uneven bars behind Daria Spiridonova and Urazova. She later withdrew from the floor exercise final citing health reasons. Shortly after the conclusion of the Russian Cup Melnikova was named to the nominative team for the 2019 World Championships alongside Akhaimova, Spiridonova, Anastasia Agafonova, Angelina Simakova (later replaced by Maria Paseka), and Aleksandra Shchekoldina. This announcement made Melnikova the only Russian gymnast to be a member of all three world championships teams during the 2017–2020 quadrennium.

During qualifications she helped Russia qualify to the team final in third place behind the United States and China. Individually Melnikova qualified to the all-around in fourth place behind Simone Biles and Sunisa Lee of the United States and Mélanie de Jesus dos Santos of France, the uneven bars final in eighth place, and the floor exercise final in third place behind Biles and Lee. Despite Valentina Rodionenko's, the head coach of the Russian women's gymnastics team, low expectations for the team, they won the silver medal in the team final with Melnikova contributing scores on all four apparatuses.

During the all-around final Melnikova finished with a score of 56.399, earning the bronze medal behind Biles and Tang Xijing of China. This was Melnikova's first individual medal at a world championships. She recorded the third highest score of the day on floor exercise behind Biles and Lee and the fourth highest balance beam score behind Biles, Tang, and Flávia Saraiva of Brazil and tied with Canadian Ellie Black and Li Shijia of China. During the uneven bars final Melnikova performed a clean routine and earned a score of 14.733, finishing fourth behind Nina Derwael of Belgium, Becky Downie of Great Britain, and Lee. The following day, she competed in the floor final and earned the bronze medal behind Biles and Lee.

In late October Melnikova competed at the Brabant Trophy where she was partnered with Ivan Stretovich. They finished in second place behind the team from the Netherlands composed of Sanna Veerman and Bart Deurloo. In December she competed at the Tokyo International Cup in Aichi, Japan where she won gold on vault, uneven bars, and balance beam and placed seventh on floor exercise.

2020
In mid January it was announced that Melnikova would compete at the Italian Serie A competition as part of the Lissone LAG club. Later that month it was announced that she would compete at the Stuttgart World Cup taking place in March. The Stuttgart World Cup was later canceled due to the COVID-19 pandemic in Germany.  In late September it was announced that Melnikova would be competing at an upcoming competition in Hiroshima to take place in November alongside Lilia Akhaimova (later replaced by Aleksandra Shchekoldina), Elena Gerasimova, and Yana Vorona.  At the Friendship & Solidarity Meet she was on the Friendship team and they placed second.  While individual titles were not being contested, Melnikova scored the highest all-around total with 56.700 and recorded the highest uneven bars and floor exercise scores and the second highest vault and balance beam scores behind American Shilese Jones and Zhang Jin of China respectively.

2021
Melnikova competed at the Russian National Championships in March.  She finished third in the all-around behind new seniors Viktoria Listunova and Vladislava Urazova. During event finals Melnikova won gold on vault and floor exercise and bronze on uneven bars once again behind Urazova and Listunova.  Melnikova was later selected to compete at the European Championships in Basel alongside Urazova, Listunova, and Elena Gerasimova.  During qualifications Melnikova qualified to the all-around, uneven bars, and floor exercise finals in first place and the vault final in second place behind Jessica Gadirova.  During the all-around final Melnikova fell off both the uneven bars and the balance beam but still managed to finish in second place behind Listunova.  On the first day of event finals Melnikova won bronze on vault behind Giulia Steingruber and Gadirova, and won gold on the uneven bars.  On the final day of the competition Melnikova won silver on floor exercise behind Gadirova.

Melnikova competed at the Russian Cup in June.  During qualifications she finished in first place.  During the all-around final she fell off the balance beam and finish third behind Listunova and Urazova.  After the competition Valentina Rodionenko, the senior coach of the Russian national artistic gymnastics team, announced that Melnikova would be on the Olympic Team along with Listunova and Urazova.

At the Olympic Games Melnikova qualified to the all-around, vault, uneven bars, and floor exercise event finals.  Additionally she helped the Russian Olympic Committee qualify to the team final in a surprise first place, ahead of the United States team.  During the team final USA's team leader Simone Biles withdrew after the first of four rotations; Melnikova competed on all four apparatuses.  Although Melnikova and teammate Urazova fell off the balance beam, the Russian team performed well on all other routines and finished in first place, over three points ahead of the second place American team. This marked the first time Russia had won the Olympic team gold, as their previous team titles are accredited to the Soviet Union.  Additionally it marked the end of Team USA's decade-long Olympic and World Championships winning streak.

During the all-around final Melnikova hit all four of her routines and finished third behind Sunisa Lee and Rebeca Andrade to earn the bronze medal, her first individual Olympic medal. On the first day of event finals Melnikova finished fifth on vault and eighth on uneven bars. The following day Melnikova performed a clean routine and won the bronze medal on floor exercise behind Jade Carey and Vanessa Ferrari and tying with Mai Murakami, winning her second individual and fourth overall Olympic medal.

In September it was announced that Melnikova would compete at the upcoming World Championships alongside Yana Vorona, Maria Minaeva, and Olympic teammate Urazova.  While there she qualified to the all-around final in first place and to all four apparatus finals. She won the gold medal in the all-around, becoming the third Russian woman to do so and the first since Aliya Mustafina did so in 2010.  By winning the all-around title Melnikova ended the United States' eleven-year World/Olympic all-around winning streak.  Two days after winning the all-around Melnikova won a bronze medal on vault behind Rebeca Andrade and Asia D'Amato.  On the final day of competition she won a silver medal on floor exercise behind Mai Murakami.

In November Melnikova competed at the Arthur Gander Memorial.  She won the three-event all-around, finishing over four points ahead of Taïs Boura of France and Ciena Alipio of the United States.  Next Melnikova competed at the Swiss Cup where she was partnered with Nikita Nagornyy.  They won the competition ahead of the Ukrainian team of Illia Kovtun and Yelyzaveta Hubareva.

2022 
Melnikova returned to competition at the Russian Cup in July.  She placed first in the all-around, on vault, and on floor exercise and second on uneven bars and balance beam behind Viktoria Listunova and Yana Vorona respectively.  Melnikova did not compete in any international competitions due to the International Gymnastics Federation banning Russian and Belarusian athletes and officials from taking part in FIG-sanctioned competitions due to the 2022 Russian invasion of Ukraine.

Competitive history

International scores

References

External links 

 
 Angelina Melnikova at sportgymrus.ru 
 

2000 births
Living people
Russian female artistic gymnasts
Sportspeople from Voronezh
Gymnasts at the 2016 Summer Olympics
Gymnasts at the 2019 European Games
Olympic gymnasts of Russia
European champions in gymnastics
Medalists at the 2016 Summer Olympics
Olympic silver medalists for Russia
Olympic gold medalists for the Russian Olympic Committee athletes
Olympic bronze medalists for the Russian Olympic Committee athletes
Olympic medalists in gymnastics
European Games gold medalists for Russia
European Games silver medalists for Russia
European Games medalists in gymnastics
Medalists at the World Artistic Gymnastics Championships
Gymnasts at the 2020 Summer Olympics
Medalists at the 2020 Summer Olympics
World champion gymnasts